This is a list of Bien de Interés Cultural landmarks in the Province of Girona, Catalonia, Spain.

Bien by municipality

A

Agullana

Albanyà

Avinyonet de Puigventós

B 

Bàscara

Biure

Boadella i les Escaules

Borrassà

C 

Cabanes

Cadaqués

Cantallops

Castelló d’Empúries
{| class="wikitable"
|+ Bien de interés cultural in Castelló d’Empúries
! Name of monument!!BIC type!!Type!!Coordinates!!BIC#!!Date!!Image
|-
| Fort Fuseller(Baluard or Torre Carlina) || Monument || Tower ||  ||  ||  || 
|-
| Església de Santa Maria d'Empúries || Monument || Church ||  ||  ||  || 
|-
| La Casa Gran || Monument || Building ||  ||  ||  || 
|-
| Muralles i Porta de la Gallarda || Monument || Battlement ||  ||  ||  || 
|-
| Palau Comtal(Convento de Santo Domingo) || Monument || Palace ||  ||  ||  || 
|-
| Torre Ribota || Monument || Tower || n/a ||  ||  || n/a
|-
| Zona dels estanys i la platja || Monument || Historic site || n/a ||  ||  || n/a
|}

Cistella

 F 

El Far d'Empordà

 G 
Garrigàs

Garriguella

 L 

L'Escala

 P 

Palau de Santa Eulàlia

Palau-saverdera

Pau

Pedret i Marzà

Peralada

 R 
Rabós

Roses

 S 
Sant Llorenç de la Muga

Sant Miquel de Fluvià

Sant Mori

Sant Pere Pescador

Saus, Camallera i Llampaies

Siurana

 T 
Terrades

Torroella de Fluvià

 V 
Ventalló

Vilabertran

Viladamat

Vilafant

Vilajuïga

Vilamacolum

Vilamalla

Vilamaniscle

Vilanant

Vilasacra (Vila-sacra)''

Vilaür

References 

Girona